1858 Lobachevskij is a rare-type background asteroid from the central region of the asteroid belt, approximately 13 kilometers in diameter. It was discovered on 18 August 1972, by Soviet astronomer Lyudmila Zhuravleva at the Crimean Astrophysical Observatory in Nauchnyj, on the Crimean peninsula. The asteroid was named after Russian mathematician Nikolai Lobachevsky.

Orbit and classification 

Lobachevskij had already been photographed in precovery images dating back to the 1930s, providing it with a much larger observation arc. It orbits the Sun in the central main-belt at a distance of 2.5–2.9 AU once every 4 years and 5 months (1,620 days). Its orbit has an eccentricity of 0.08 and an inclination of 2° with respect to the ecliptic.

Naming 

This minor planet was named in honor of mathematician Nikolai Lobachevsky (1792–1856), Russian mathematician and creator of the first comprehensive system of non-Euclidean geometry. The official  was published by the Minor Planet Center on 1 June 1975.

Physical characteristics 

Lobachevskij is a strongly reddish and relatively uncommon L-type asteroid in the SMASS classification. It has an absolute magnitude between 11.5 and 12.4.

Lightcurves 

In May 2011, photometric observation of Lobachevskij gave a rotation period of 5.413 and 5.435 hours with a brightness amplitude of 0.30 and 0.33 magnitude, respectively, superseding a previous period of 7.00 hours.

In September 2012, two rotational lightcurves were obtained in the S- and R-band at the Palomar Transient Factory in California. Lightcurve analysis gave a period of 5.409 and 5.4141 hours with an amplitude of 0.26 and 0.22 magnitude, respectively.

Occultation 

Lobachevskij covered a 10.4 mag star—a phenomenon known as occultation—in the constellation Sagittarius in June 2007. It was predicted that the event could be seen in the northeastern United States and southeast Canada. The combined light magnitude of the bodies would drop momentarily—for a maximum of 2.2 seconds.

Diameter and albedo 

According to the survey carried out by NASA's Wide-field Infrared Survey Explorer with its subsequent NEOWISE mission, Lobachevskij measures between 10.769 and 10.919 kilometers in diameter, and its surface has an albedo between 0.3737 and 0.383, respectively, while the Collaborative Asteroid Lightcurve Link assumes a lower albedo of 0.18 and calculates a diameter of 12.47 kilometers with an absolute magnitude of 12.0.

References

External links 
 Asteroid Lightcurve Database (LCDB), query form (info )
 Dictionary of Minor Planet Names, Google books
 Asteroids and comets rotation curves, CdR – Observatoire de Genève, Raoul Behrend
 Discovery Circumstances: Numbered Minor Planets (1)-(5000) – Minor Planet Center
 
 

001858
Discoveries by Lyudmila Zhuravleva
Named minor planets
001858
19720818